Lawn bowls was among the sports contested at the 2022 Commonwealth Games, to be held in England. This was the twenty-first staging of lawn bowls at the Commonwealth Games having featured in every Games bar 1966, and the third staging within England specifically.

The competition was scheduled to take place between 29 July and 6 August 2022, spread across eleven events (including three parasport events).

Schedule
The competition schedule was as follows:

Venue
The lawn bowls competition will be held at the Victoria Park bowling greens in Leamington Spa.

Qualification (parasport)

A total of 36 parasport bowlers (18 pairs) nominally qualify to compete at the Games. They qualify for each event as follows:
 One pair from the host nation.
 Five pairs (one per nation, excluding the hosts) receive a CGF / International Bowls for the Disabled (IBD) Bipartite Invitation.

Medal table

Medallists

Men

Women

Para-sport

Participating nations
There were 24 participating Commonwealth Games Associations (CGA's) in lawn bowls with a total of 227 (118 men and 109 women) athletes. The number of athletes a nation entered is in parentheses beside the name of the country.

References

External links
 Official website: 2022 Commonwealth Games – Lawn Bowls and Para Lawn Bowls

 
2022
Lawn bowls
Commonwealth Games
2022 Commonwealth Games
Parasports competitions
Sport in Warwickshire